is a district located in Nagano Prefecture, Japan.

Municipalities 
There are 3 towns and 10 villages within the district.
 Anan
 Matsukawa
 Takamori
 Achi
 Hiraya
 Neba
 Ōshika
 Shimojō
 Takagi
 Tenryū
 Toyooka
 Urugi
 Yasuoka

Timeline 
 1878: The district was formed out from Ina District. The seat was located at Iida.
 July 1, 1993: The town of Kamisato merged into the expanded city of Iida.
 October 1, 2005: The villages of Kami and Minamishinano merged into the expanded city of Iida.
 January 1, 2006: The village of Namiai merged into the village of Achi.
 March 31, 2009: The village of Seinaiji merged into the village of Achi.

References 

Districts in Nagano Prefecture
States and territories established in 1878
1878 establishments in Japan